Gevaert is a Flemish surname. Notable people with the surname include:

Agfa-Gevaert, Belgian imaging technologies company
Agfa-Gevaert Tournament, English golf tournament between 1963 and 1971
François-Auguste Gevaert (1828–1908), Belgian composer
Kim Gevaert (born 1978), Belgian sprinter
Lieven Gevaert (1868–1935), Belgian industrialist

See also
8700 Gevaert, asteroid

Surnames of Belgian origin